Zimmerman may refer to:
Zimmerman (surname), a surname and a list of people with the name
Zimmerman, Ontario, Canada
Zimmerman, Minnesota, U.S.
Zimmerman, Pennsylvania, U.S.

See also
Justice Zimmerman (disambiguation)
Zimerman, a surname and a list of people with the name
Zimmerman Kame, an archeological site in Hardin County, Ohio
Zimmermann (disambiguation)
Zimmer (disambiguation)
Zuckermann